Cide, also Karaağaç, is a town in the Kastamonu Province in the Black Sea region of Turkey. It is the seat of Cide District. Its population is 11,087 (2021). It lies near the Black Sea coast. The town consists of 16 quarters: Cumhuriyet, Ece, Kasaba, Kemerli, Nasuh, Memiş, Bağyurdu, Gebeş, Irmak, Kalafat, Kasımköy, Kırcı, Kumluca, Sipahi, Sofular and Tarakçı.

History
In the late 19th and early 20th century, Cide was part of the Kastamonu Vilayet of the Ottoman Empire.

Image gallery

References

Populated places in Cide District
Fishing communities in Turkey
Populated coastal places in Turkey